Józef Unszlicht or Iosif Stanislavovich Unshlikht (nicknames "Jurowski", "Leon") (31 December 1879 – 29 July 1938) was a Polish and Russian revolutionary activist, a Soviet government official and one of the founders of the Cheka.

Biography
Unszlicht was born in Mława, Płock Governorate, Congress Poland, in a Jewish family. He joined the revolutionary movement in 1896, as a student in Warsaw studying electrical engineering. In 1900, he joined the Social Democracy of the Kingdom of Poland and Lithuania (SDKPiL), led by Rosa Luxemburg and  Leo Jogiches. For his conspiratorial activities in Warsaw and Lódz, he was arrested seven times in 1902-13. In 1911, he joined the rozlamovists, a group of mainly younger SDPKiL members, led by Yakov Ganetsky, who opposed Jogiches' leadership methods, and who were close to Vladimir Lenin and the Bolsheviks. The split became so acrimonious that the SDPKiL leadership accused Unszlicht of being a police agent, an accusation that seems to have been baseless.

At the time of the February Revolution, Unszlicht was in exile in Siberia, where he was elected a member of the Irkutsk soviet, and joined the Bolsheviks. In April, he moved to Petrograd, where he helped organise the Bolsheviks' military organisation. He was arrested for his role in the July Days and held in Krestny prison, but soon released. In December 1917, he was one of the founders of Cheka. In 1919 he served briefly as People's Commissar for Military Affairs in Lithuania and Belarus. During the Polish–Soviet War, in August 1920, he served on the Provisional Polish Revolutionary Committee, which would have become the government of communist Poland had the Poles lost the war. 

In 1921, Unszlicht was appointed Deputy head of Cheka, under Felix Dzerzhinsky, but they fell out in 1923, after a series of bomb attacks in Warsaw, which Unszlicht appears to have instigated, without consulting Dzerzhinsky or the leadership of the Communist Party of Poland. He was transferred to the post of chief of supply for the Red Army, although Leon Trotsky, the People's Commissar for War, regarded him as "an ambitious but talentless intriguer" who had been placed there to undermine him. On 6 February, 1925, he was appointed Deputy People's Commissar for War. In 1930, he was transferred to economic work, in an apparent demotion. In September 1933, he was appointed head of the Civil Air Fleet. In February 1935, he replaced Avel Yenukidze as Secretary of the All-Russian Central Executive Committee of the Soviet Union.

Arrest and execution  

Józef Unszlicht was arrested on 11 June 1937. Two weeks later, the head of the NKVD, Nikolay Yezhov told a plenum of the Central Committee of the Communist Party that the police had uncovered a "Polish Military Organisation" of spies who had infiltrated the USSR by posing as political émigrés, and named Unszlicht as its leader. He confessed under interrogation - presumably under torture - and named as his 'accomplices' most of the leading members of the Polish Communist Party in exile, who were arrested and shot. He retracted his testimony at his trial, on 28 July 1938, but was sentenced to death and executed at the Kommunarka shooting ground. He was rehabilitated in 1956.

Family 
Unszlicht's brother Julian was a journalist who "fought against the socialist movement in general and especially against Jewish involvement in it." In later years, Julian converted to Catholicism and joined the priesthood.

His nephew, Max Maximov-Unszlicht, was chief of the Soviet military intelligence operating in Nazi Germany for nearly three years and was also arrested and probably executed during the Great Purge.

Honours and awards

References

External links

 Unszlicht files from his trial in 1937

1879 births
1938 deaths
Cheka officers
People from Mława
People from Płock Governorate
Social Democracy of the Kingdom of Poland and Lithuania politicians
Russian Social Democratic Labour Party members
Old Bolsheviks
Central Committee of the Communist Party of the Soviet Union candidate members
Polish communists
Russian Constituent Assembly members
Lithuanian–Byelorussian Soviet Socialist Republic people
Central Executive Committee of the Soviet Union members
Cheka
Jews from the Russian Empire
19th-century Polish Jews
20th-century Polish Jews
Soviet people of Polish-Jewish descent
Soviet Jews
Polish Operation of the NKVD
Jews executed by the Soviet Union
Great Purge victims from Poland
Executed people from Masovian Voivodeship
Polish revolutionaries